Ordinary Heroes is a 1986 American made-for-television war drama film directed by Peter H. Cooper. It premiered on ABC on October 19, 1986.

The film is a remake of the 1945 film Pride of the Marines, but set in the Vietnam War instead of World War II.

Plot
In 1971, Tony (Richard Dean Anderson) fell in love with Maria (Valerie Bertinelli), but their future was abruptly put on hold when Tony was drafted to fight in the Vietnam War. When he returned to the country two years later, she was still waiting for him, but he was no longer the same.

Cast and characters
Richard Dean Anderson as Tony Kaiser
Valerie Bertinelli as Maria Pezzo
Doris Roberts as Edith Burnside
Jesse D. Goins as Ken Bryant
Matthew Laurance as Dr. Farber
Richard Baxter as Steve Burnside
Emily Love as Tina Burnside
Liz Torres as Miss Cortez

Production
Parts of the film were shot in Salt Lake City and Magna, Utah.

References

External links

1986 television films
1986 films
1986 drama films
1980s war drama films
Films set in the 1970s
Films shot in Salt Lake City
American war drama films
Vietnam War films
Films set in 1971
Films set in 1973
Films shot in Utah
American drama television films
1980s American films